This annotated list of individual monkeys includes monkeys who are in some way famous or notable. The list does not include notable apes, or fictional primates.

Monkey actors
 Binx - (white-headed capuchin)  Appeared in Ace Ventura: Pet Detective, Ace Ventura: When Nature Calls, George of the Jungle, and Bruce Almighty.
 Govi - (capuchin) Played Sophocles in the 1993-1994 sitcom Monkey Please, Sophocles! that aired in Azerbaijan as a satire of the political climate in the country at the time.
 Finster - (brown capuchin) Played Harvey Keitel's pet thief, Dodger, in the 1994 film Monkey Trouble.
 Crystal - (brown capuchin) Played in The Hangover Part II, Night at the Museum, Night at the Museum: Battle of the Smithsonian, Night at the Museum: Secret of the Tomb and as "Annie's Boobs" in Community.
 Boo - (brown capuchin) Played Ella in the 1988 movie Monkey Shines.
 Katie - (white-headed capuchin) One of two monkeys to play Marcel, Ross Geller's pet monkey in season 1 of the 1994-2004 sitcom Friends.  Appeared in Sam & Cat, 30 Rock, and The Loop (American TV series).

Monkeys used in experiments

 Able - (rhesus macaque) and Baker - (peruvian squirrel monkey), both female, the first monkeys sent into space to survive the experience. They were launched on 28 May 1959 in the nose cone of a Jupiter AM-18 missile as a test of NASA's launch facilities at Cape Canaveral and procedures for retrieving astronauts after splashdown. Miss Able died a few months after the mission, but Miss Baker lived another 25 years. 
 Albert II - (rhesus monkey) the first primate and first mammal in space, June 14, 1949. Died upon hitting the ground due to a parachute failure 
 ANDi - (rhesus monkey) the first genetic modified rhesus monkey, born at the Oregon Health & Science University
 Britches - (stump-tailed macaque) removed from his mother at birth, Britches was left alone with his eyes sewn shut as part of a study into blindness. He was rescued by the Animal Liberation Front, which publicized the condition he was found in, and the experiment was shut down.
Gordo (also known as "Old Reliable") - (squirrel monkey) He was launched in the US Jupiter AM-13 Rocket in 1958, but was lost after a technical failure at the end of the mission.
 Hellion - (capuchin) trained by Mary Joan Willard to assist disabled people, was the first trainee to be placed. In 1979, Hellion started assisting a quadriplegic, Robert Foster, with chores and general assistance.
 Miss Sam - (rhesus macaque) sent into space under the Little Joe program in 1960.
 Semos - a nine-year-old male rhesus macaque at the Oregon National Primate Research Center who supplied the skin cells from which scientists were able to successfully derive embryonic stem cells.
 Tetra - a rhesus macaque at the Oregon National Primate Research Center who was the first cloned primate, created through splitting.

Other 
 Corporal Jackie, a baboon of the South African army
 Darwin, a Japanese macaque who earned notoriety as the "Ikea Monkey"
 Fred, euthanized in March 2011. Fred had a reputation for stealing food anywhere he could, but when he turned too aggressive, he was caught and controversially euthanized.
 Jacco Macacco, was a fighting ape or monkey who was exhibited in monkey-baiting matches at the Westminster Pit in London in the early 1820s.
 Jack, known as Jack the Signalman .  This baboon was reputed to have become an expert at working the railroad signals for the Cape Government Railway.
 Loon, lived at the San Diego Zoo and was trained to accept blood draws and insulin injections to treat his diabetes.
 Maggie the Monkey, a crab-eating macaque who predicted the results of the Stanley Cup playoffs.
 Ramu, arrested and kept behind bars in India for 5 years on the charge of disturbing communal harmony. At the age of three, while under the care of a family, Ramu attacked some children. This sparked communal riots in the Jagannathpur village, ultimately leading to Ramu's arrest.

See also 
 List of fictional primates
 List of individual apes
 Monkeys and apes in space

References 

 
Monkeys
monkey